Invent Animate (previously stylized as Invent, Animate) is an American progressive metalcore band from Port Neches, Texas. The band formed in late 2011 and self-released their debut EP titled Waves on March 13, 2012. After a number of regional tours and increasing popularity in the online djent community, the band was signed up by Tragic Hero Records in February 2014. The band announced they would release their debut full-length record titled Everchanger on August 26, 2014. Their sophomore album Stillworld was released on July 8, 2016. Their third album and first with Marcus Vik, Greyview, was released on March 13, 2020.

History

Formation and Waves (2011-2013)
Invent Animate formed in 2011 and immediately began working on their first EP Waves. The six track EP was recorded at 456 Recordings with producer Brian Hood, former drummer of Mychildren Mybride. The EP was heavily featured on many online blogs such as ItDjents, Chugcore, got-djent, The Daily Mosh, The Djentlemen's Club and more. The track "Captive" featured Brendon McMaster of now defunct deathcore band The Crimson Armada. Following the release of their EP the band was able to play a number of shows supporting bands such as Capsize, Elitist, Close to Home, and future label mates Erra. In late 2012 they released the single "Lightfinder", which featured Aaron Matts from Betraying the Martyrs. They released a couple of singles in 2013; "Wolf Skin" and "Half-Life" the latter of which would eventually make its way onto the new album, albeit in a slightly reworked form and different tuning.

Signing to Tragic Hero Records, Everchanger and Stillworld, Ben's Departure (2014-2019)

On February 17, 2014 it was announced that Invent Animate signed a record deal with Tragic Hero Records joining bands on their roster such as A Skylit Drive, Everyone Dies in Utah and He Is Legend. A mini-EP would be released through the label's website which featured two new songs titled "Courier" and "Native Intellect" that would be on the upcoming album. On July 29, 2014 the band posted through their official Facebook page the confirmed tracklist for Everchanger as well as its release date August 26, 2014. The last song on Everchanger, "Luna", is a tribute to drummer Trey Celaya's late brother, a victim of suicide. The album was recorded at 456 Recordings with producer Brian Hood, who worked with the band for their EP and previously released singles, and Jesse Cash of Erra.

In late 2015, the band decided to move forward without founding member Logan Forrest, with drummer Trey Celaya subsequently taking on guitar duties (though only for studio sessions) for future albums. On October 29, 2015, the band released a new single "Darkbloom", which would eventually appear on the band's next effort. Their following sophomore album Stillworld, was released on July 8, 2016. Along with the music video from the song "White Wolf". In June 2017 they removed the comma from their name, which was previously stylized "Invent, Animate."

On January 9, 2018, longtime vocalist  
Ben English announced on the band's Facebook that he would be departing from the band stating that "The fire that once drove me, isn't what it once was.", and that he would continue to support the band until the day he is in the ground. He goes on to state that the cause of this was being on the road all the time which made him question if this was what he really wanted to keep doing. On June 8, 2018, the band released the instrumental edition of Stillworld.

On November 1, 2019, the band posted a short video to their Facebook and Twitter pages that teased a new single that was released on November 7, 2019.

Arrival of Marcus Vik and Greyview (2019-2021)

On 7 November 2019, the band would release the single "Cloud Cascade" and announce the new vocalist, Marcus Vik, previously the vocalist of Swedish metalcore band Aviana. As of early January 2020, the band joined Silent Planet, Greyhaven and Currents on the Trilogy tour. Just after the tour was announced, as of 11 January 2020, bassist Caleb Sherraden will not be joining the band on tour due to medical issues.

On January 24, 2020, the band released second single “Dark” and announced their album Greyview, which was released through Tragic Hero Records on March 13, 2020, and is the first album with Marcus Vik on vocals. On March 12, 2021, a year after the album's original release, the band released the instrumental edition of Greyview.

Signing to UNFD, The Sun Sleeps... EP (2021-present)

On September 10, 2021, Invent Animate announced they had left Tragic Hero Records and has signed with UNFD. They also announced a new EP titled The Sun Sleeps, As If It Never Was.

On September 23, 2021, the band released the three track EP The Sun Sleeps, As If It Never Was. The band also released a 10-minute long concept video for the EP. Drummer Trey Celaya spoke about the concept of the EP and video:  “Despite all attempts to keep our darker reality shadowed in secrecy, there comes a moment in time when the truth can no longer be hidden behind closed doors or empty excuses. And at once, everything is revealed, as if the light is a constant law of nature laying bare the secrets we believe are ours to keep. In this infinite moment, the bond shared between two loved ones is severed. The flow of time does not wash away the scars; it only immortalizes what is suspended in the balance — the pain of loss, the gift of hindsight, and the curse of hope. What will always be a memory. This EP is a true story of addiction and the trauma that lies in its aftermath of a secret too dark to be hidden.”

In early December 2021, it was announced that Trey Celaya, who had toured with the band in the past, would be joining fellow Texan metalcore band Fit for a King as their full-time drummer, after the departure of founding and long-time member Jared Easterling. It was also clarified that while Trey will continue to be a part of the songwriting and recording process for Invent Animate, he will no longer be touring with them regularly.

In early February it was announced that the band has been working on recording their next album and follow-up to Greyview for a tentative spring 2022 release. It was also stated that that band have enlisted frontman Landon Tewers of The Plot in You in the vocal production of the upcoming album.

On June 30, 2022, Invent Animate released the single "Shade Astray", announcing, that it'll be played on the upcoming "Pull From The Ghost" tour with bands Erra, Alpha Wolf, and Thornhill. It is to appear on the band's next album, scheduled for a tentative 2023 release. On November 8, 2022, the band released a new single, "Elysium".

Tours
Invent Animate is represented by SL Management and Sound Talent Group.

2014
Heavier than Heavy U.S Tour from August 8–30 with Oceano, I Declare War, The Last Ten Seconds of Life and Barrier.
Fuel the Passion U.S Tour from October 12–27 with For All I Am, Kingdom of Giants, Chasing Safety and Assassins.
Fall Tour from November 9–20 with Betraying the Martyrs and Reflections. The remainder of tour after November 14 would be cancelled due to Betraying the Martyrs being denied entry to Canada.

2015
Spring U.S Tour from March 15–26 with Veil of Maya and After the Burial.
Appearance at South by So What?! Festival on March 20 in Grand Prairie, Texas.
Summer U.S Tour from June 24 – July 17 with Phinehas and Silent Planet.
Fall U.S Tour from September 4–20 with Erra, Polyphia and The Afterimage.
Fall North American Tour from November 5 – December 11 with Texas In July (farewell tour), Reflections and To The Wind.

2016
Happiness in Self Destruction from July 9 – August 6 with The Plot in You, Erra and Sylar.
Overdose Winter Tour from November 11 – December 18 with The Word Alive, Volumes and Islander.

2017
Carry the Flame Tour from February 22 – March 23 with After the Burial, Emmure, Fit for a King and Fit for an Autopsy.
Canada 2017 Tour from July 12–29 with Northlane and Intervals.
Hikari Album Release Tour from November 1–22 with Oceans Ate Alaska, Dayseeker and Afterlife.
Mesmer World Tour from November 23 – December 17 with Northlane, Erra and Ocean Grove.

2020
Trilogy Tour from February 20 – March 22 with Silent Planet, Currents and Greyhaven.

2022
Spring North American Tour from March 12 - April 16 with Like Moths to Flames, Polaris, and Alpha Wolf.
Summer USA tour from July 15 - August 20 with Erra, Thornhill, and Alpha Wolf

Members

Current
 Keaton Goldwire – guitars (2011–present)
 Caleb Sherraden – bass (2011–present)
 Marcus Vik – vocals  (2019–present)

Touring
Brody Taylor Smith - drums (2022–present)
Lukas Vitullo - drums (2022)

Session
 Trey Celaya – drums, backing vocals, guitars (studio only) (2011–2021) (session 2021–present)

Former
 Cody Graham – guitars (2011)
 Logan Forrest – guitars (2011–2015)
 Ben English – vocals (2011–2018)

Timeline

Musical style
Invent Animate incorporates elements of metalcore, progressive metalcore, progressive metal, ambient, djent, and post-hardcore in their music. They often feature start-and-stop arrangements of calm atmospheric passages and intense metalcore breakdowns. The band's guitar work prominently features slide tapping, dissonance, and technical riffs. The band delivers vocals in a wide range, including mid-pitch screams, low death growls, and somber clean singing. The band has been compared to ERRA, Northlane, Architects, Misery Signals, Reflections, and The Air I Breathe.

Discography
Albums

EPs
 Waves (2012)
 Native Intellect (2014)
 The Sun Sleeps, As If It Never Was (UNFD) (2021)

Singles
 "Lightfinder" (featuring Aaron Matts of Betraying the Martyrs) (2012)
 "Wolf Skin" (2013)
 "Shade Astray" (2022)
 "Elysium" (2022)
 "Immolation Of Night" (2023)
 "Without A Whisper" (2023)

References

Metalcore musical groups from Texas
Musical groups established in 2011
American progressive metal musical groups
Tragic Hero Records artists
Heavy metal musical groups from Texas
2011 establishments in Texas